Meet the Robinsons is a 2007 American computer-animated science-fiction comedy film produced by Walt Disney Animation Studios and released by Walt Disney Pictures. The 47th Disney animated feature film, it is loosely based on the 1990 children's book A Day with Wilbur Robinson by William Joyce. The film was directed by Stephen J. Anderson (in his feature directorial debut) and produced by Dorothy McKim, from a screenplay written by Anderson, Don Hall, Nathan Greno, Joe Mateo, Aurian Redson, Jon Bernstein, and Michelle Spitz. The film stars the voices of Daniel Hansen, Jordan Fry, Wesley Singerman, Angela Bassett, Tom Selleck, Harland Williams, Laurie Metcalf, Nicole Sullivan, Adam West, Ethan Sandler, Tom Kenny, and Anderson. Meet the Robinsons follows the interactions between Lewis (Fry), an orphaned 12-year-old inventor desperate to be adopted, and Wilbur Robinson (Singerman), a young time-traveler who travels to the year 2037 to visit the family. Along the way, the two must prevent a mysterious bowler-hatted man (Anderson) from changing Lewis' story, and, by proxy, the entire future.

Originally titled A Day with Wilbur Robinson, development of Meet the Robinsons began in June 2004, with a release planned for 2006. At the time of the production, Anderson was confirmed as the director due to his personal connection to the main character Lewis, as they grew up adopted. The designs of the characters were inspired by Pixar's The Incredibles, while the inspiration for the film came from Disney animated classics, such as Alice in Wonderland, Cinderella, and Peter Pan, and from Warner Brothers cartoons to capture the 1950s aesthetic. Disney's acquisition of Pixar in early 2006 led to nearly 60% of the film being scrapped and redone, such as the villain and the ending scene. Danny Elfman provided the film's score with artists such as Rufus Wainwright, Rob Thomas, The All-American Rejects and They Might Be Giants contributing tracks for the film.

Meet the Robinsons premiered at the El Capitan Theatre in Los Angeles on March 25, 2007, and was released in standard and Disney Digital 3-D formats in the United States on March 30. The film received generally positive reviews from critics, with praise directed towards the animation and story. However, it was a box office bomb, grossing $169.3 million against a budget of $150 million.

Plot
Lewis is an aspiring 12-year-old inventor who grew up in an orphanage. His energy and eccentricity have been scaring off potential parents, so he works all night on a machine to scan his memory to locate his birth mother, who abandoned him at the orphanage when he was a baby. While taking the scanner to his school's science fair, Lewis meets 13-year-old Wilbur Robinson, a mysterious boy claiming to be a time cop from the future. Wilbur needs to recover a time machine that a man wearing a bowler hat has stolen. Lewis tries to demonstrate the scanner, but it has been sabotaged by Bowler Hat Guy and falls apart, throwing the science fair into chaos. Lewis leaves while the Bowler Hat Guy, with the help of his robotic bowler hat named Doris, steals the scanner.

Wilbur meets Lewis at the orphanage and asks him to repair the scanner. Lewis demands proof that Wilbur is telling the truth. Wilbur does so by taking them in a second time machine to the year 2037, which is highly advanced technologically. When they arrive, Lewis realizes he can simply use the time machine to meet his mother; the resulting argument makes them crash. Wilbur asks Lewis to fix the time machine, and Lewis agrees on the condition that Wilbur has to take him to visit his mother afterwards. Reluctantly, Wilbur agrees and hides Lewis in the garage. Lewis accidentally leaves, however, and ends up meeting the rest of the Robinson family except for Cornelius, Wilbur's father and the inventor of the time's technologies, who is away on a business trip. Having followed Lewis, the Bowler Hat Guy and Doris try to kidnap him, but the Robinsons beat them back. The Robinsons offer to adopt Lewis, but change their mind when they learn that he is from the past. Wilbur admits to lying to Lewis about taking him back to see his mom, causing Lewis to run off in disgust.

The Bowler Hat Guy and Doris approach Lewis, and offer to take him to his mother if he fixes the memory scanner. Once he does, they betray him and tie him up. The Bowler Hat Guy reveals that Cornelius Robinson is, in fact, Lewis's future self, and that he himself is an adult version of Lewis's roommate, Michael "Goob" Yagoobian. Because he was kept awake by Lewis's work on the scanner, Goob fell asleep during a Little League baseball game and failed to make an important catch, costing his team the championship. Goob became so withdrawn and bitter that he was never adopted and remained in the orphanage long after it closed. Doris is "DOR-15", one of Lewis's failed and abandoned inventions. They both blamed Lewis for their misfortunes and decided to ruin his life. Leaving Lewis in the future, they return to the past and enact their plan. However, it is revealed that Doris tricked everyone; once mass-produced, the Doris hats dispose of Goob and enslave humanity. Lewis repairs the second time machine, confronts Doris in the past, and destroys her by promising to never invent her, restoring the future to its utopian state. Wilbur tries to ask the adult Goob to join the family, but he has fled in remorse.

Back in Wilbur's time, Lewis finally meets Cornelius face to face. Cornelius explains how the memory scanner started their successful career, and persuades Lewis to return to the science fair. Wilbur takes Lewis back, but makes one stop first: as he promised, he takes Lewis back to see the moment when his mother abandoned him.

Wilbur drops Lewis off in his own time and leaves. Lewis heads to the fair, en route waking up Goob just in time for him to make the winning catch. Back at the fair, Lewis asks for one more chance to demonstrate his scanner, which this time succeeds. He is adopted by Lucille, one of the science fair judges, and her husband Bud, who nicknames him "Cornelius" and takes him home.

The film ends with a quote which reiterates the message of not dwelling on failures and "keep moving forward", attributed to Walt Disney.

Voice cast

Jordan Fry and Daniel Hansen as Lewis, a 12-year-old boy genius who struggles to become adopted.
Tom Selleck as Cornelius, Lewis' older self
 Wesley Singerman as Wilbur Robinson, the 13-year-old son of Franny and Cornelius Robinson who is the young time-traveler.
 Stephen Anderson as Bowler Hat Guy, Michael “Goob” Yagoobian's future self and Lewis's old roommate.
Matthew Josten as Michael "Goob" Yagoobian, the Bowler Hat Guy's younger self
Anderson also provided the voices of Grandpa Bud Robinson, Lewis's adoptive father; and Cousin Tallulah, the daughter of Fritz and Petunia Robinson, and Laszlo's sister.
 Harland Williams as Carl, the Robinson family's robot.
 Nicole Sullivan as Franny Robinson, the wife of Cornelius Robinson, mother of Wilbur Robinson, and the sister of Gaston and Art Robinson.
Jessie Flower as young Franny
 Angela Bassett as Mildred, the head of the Sixth Street Orphanage.
 Adam West as Uncle Art, a pizza delivery man with a superhero persona, Gaston and Franny's brother, and Wilbur's uncle.
 Laurie Metcalf as Lucille Krunklehorn, Lewis's adoptive mother.
 Ethan Sandler as:
DOR-15 (Doris), a bowler hat designed by Cornelius Robinson to be a helping hat, but expanded beyond its intelligence for revenge.
Uncle Fritz, Petunia Robinson's husband, Bud and Joe Robinson's brother, and the father of Laszlo and Tallulah Robinson.
Aunt Petunia, a hand puppet who is the wife of Fritz Robinson and the mother of Laszlo and Tallulah Robinson.
Uncle Spike and Uncle Dimitri, a pair of twins who sit in potted plants in front of the Robinson household. It is unknown who they're related to.
Cousin Laszlo, the son of Fritz and Petunia Robinson, and Tallulah's brother.
CEO of InventCo
 Don Hall as Uncle Gaston, Franny and Art Robinson's brother, and Wilbur's uncle.
Hall also provided the voice of the Gym Coach
 Tom Kenny as Mr. Willerstein, Lewis's teacher.
 Kelly Hoover as Aunt Billie, Joe Robinson's wife.
 Tracey Miller-Zarneke as Lizzy, a student from Lewis’ school who presents her fire ants at the science fair.
 Joe Mateo as Tiny the T-Rex, the Robinson family's pet dinosaur.
 Aurian Redson as Frankie the Frog, the lead singer of Franny's musical band of frogs.
Jamie Cullum as the singing voice of Frankie the Frog
 Paul Butcher as Stanley, a student from Lewis’ school who presents a volcano at the science fair.
 Dara McGarry as the InventCo Receptionist, and Mrs. Harrington
 John H. H. Ford as Mr. Harrington
 Nathan Greno as Lefty, an octopus and the Robinson family's butler.
†Note: The character of Lewis was voiced by both Daniel Hansen and Jordan Fry. Daniel Hansen voiced Lewis at the beginning of the film's production, and when the studio needed Lewis' lines changed, they had Jordan Fry re-dub many segments.

Production

Originally titled A Day with Wilbur Robinson, production began in June 2004, and was scheduled for a 2006 release. During the film's production, Walt Disney Animation Studios' storyboard artist Stephen Anderson decided to direct the film due to his personal connection to Lewis, since they both grew up adopted.

The studio planned to adapt Joyce's style to the film, but due to his involvement stylistically in Blue Sky Studios' Robots, the style was slightly reworked. While still taking cues from his retro style, influenced by everything from Technicolor movies to '40s architectural design, the crew also took inspiration from the company Apple. Unlike their previous film Chicken Little, a film starring CG animals, the animation crew had the challenge to animate CG humans. They took inspiration from Pixar's The Incredibles when animating the characters. They also took inspiration from Disney animated classics, such as Alice in Wonderland, Cinderella, and Peter Pan, and from Warner Brothers cartoons to capture the 1950s aesthetic.

While the film was in production, The Walt Disney Company announced on January 24, 2006, that it would be acquiring Pixar, and as a result, John Lasseter became the chief creative officer of both Pixar and Walt Disney Animation Studios. When he saw an early screening for the movie, he told Anderson that he did not find the villain scary or threatening enough, and suggested that he make some changes. Ten months later, almost 60% of the film had been scrapped and redone. The villain had improved and was given a new sidekick, a dinosaur chase had been added, and the ending was changed.

Release
Over 600 REAL D Cinema digital 3D-equipped theaters presented Disney Digital 3-D version of the film. In all theatrical showings, the standard version of the film was preceded by the 1938 Mickey Mouse short film Boat Builders and the 3D version was preceded by the 1953 Chip 'n Dale 3D short Working for Peanuts. The final credits of the 3D version were left two-dimensional, except for the names of those who converted the film to 3D.

Home media
The DVD and Blu-ray versions were both released on October 23, 2007. Both versions feature 1.78 widescreen aspect ratio and Dolby Digital 5.1 surround sound, plus music videos, the "Family Function 5000" game, deleted scenes, and other bonus features. The DVD's audio commentary contains Anderson's narration, occasionally interrupted by himself as the Bowler Hat Guy. The Blu-ray also includes uncompressed 5.1 audio and a BD-J game, Bowler Hat Barrage!. A 3D Blu-ray was released on November 8, 2011.

As of January 2008, the DVD had sold approximately 4 million copies.

Reception

Critical reception
The site's critics consensus states, "Meet the Robinsons is a visually impressive children's animated film marked by a story of considerable depth." Metacritic reported the film had a weighted average score of 61 out of 100 based on 27 critic reviews, indicating "generally favorable reviews". Audiences polled by CinemaScore gave the film an average grade of "A–" on an A+ to F scale.

Realmovienews stated that it has "a snappy plot that demands close attention as it whizzes back and forth in the space-time continuum, touching on serious ideas and proposing some rather disturbing alternate realities. And the witty story twists are handled with rare subtlety and intelligence. In the end it may get a little weepy and inspirational. But it's so charming that we don't mind at all". Danny Minton of the Beaumont Journal said that "The Robinsons might not be a family you want to hang out with, but they sure were fun to meet in this imaginative and beautiful 3-D experience". Andrew L. Urban of Australian Urban Cinefile said that "Walt Disney stood for fantasy on screen and this is a loving tribute to his legacy". Kyle Smith of the New York Post named it the 10th best film of 2007.

Conversely, A. O. Scott of The New York Times wrote: "Meet the Robinsons is surely one of the worst theatrically released animated features issued under the Disney label in quite some time", while Lisa Schwarzbaum of Entertainment Weekly gave the film a "C" and said "This is one bumpy ride".

Box office
The film grossed $25,123,781 on its opening weekend, falling behind Blades of Glory. Over its theatrical run, it grossed $97,822,171 in the United States and Canada and $71,510,863 in other territories, totaling $169,333,034 worldwide.

Soundtrack

The soundtrack album was released by Walt Disney Records on March 27, 2007. It includes four original songs written for the film, performed by Rufus Wainwright, Jamie Cullum, and Rob Thomas. Contributors to the album beyond the Danny Elfman score include another track by Wainwright ("The Motion Waltz (Emotional Commotion)"), The All-American Rejects ("The Future Has Arrived"), They Might Be Giants ("There's a Great Big Beautiful Tomorrow"), and the Jonas Brothers ("Kids of the Future"). The track "Little Wonders", recorded by Thomas, reached number 5 on the Billboard AC chart and the top 20 in Australia and Canada.

The song "This Much Fun" by Cowboy Mouth, which was featured in the trailer, was not featured in the film or on the soundtrack. The song "There's a Great Big Beautiful Tomorrow" was originally from the Disneyland attraction General Electric's Carousel of Progress.

Video games

Disney's Meet the Robinsons  video game is available from Buena Vista Games for PlayStation 2, Xbox 360, Wii, Nintendo GameCube, Nintendo DS, and PC. The independent England-based company Climax Group developed their own adaption for the Game Boy Advance.

Cancelled sequel
Disneytoon Studios originally planned to make a sequel to the film, tentatively titled Meet the Robinsons 2: First Date. However, when John Lasseter became Walt Disney Animation Studios' new chief creative officer, he called off all future sequels Disneytoon originally planned, including sequels to Chicken Little (2005) and The Aristocats (1970), and refocused on spin-off films and original productions.

References

External links

 
 
 
 
 
 
 

2007 comedy films
2007 films
2007 3D films
2000s American animated films
2000s children's animated films
2000s science fiction comedy films
2007 computer-animated films
3D animated films
American children's animated comic science fiction films
American computer-animated films
Animated films about dinosaurs
Animated films about orphans
Animated films based on children's books
Films about adoption
2000s English-language films
Meet the Robinsons
Films about families
Animated films about time travel
Films directed by Stephen J. Anderson
Films scored by Danny Elfman
Films set in the 1990s
Films set in 2037
Utopian films
Walt Disney Animation Studios films
Walt Disney Pictures animated films
2007 directorial debut films
Animated films about trains